"Scapegoat" is a song by Nigerian singer D'banj, released on September 16, 2010. Produced by Don Jazzy, it was included in the track listing for the unreleased album, Mr. Endowed.

Critical reception 
"Scapegoat" was met with positive reviews from music critics. Jibola L of BellaNaija said, "It’s definitely a fun listen, like most music churned from the Mo’hits factory. We’re totally loving the Highlife feeling on the song. Of course, we see him bringing back his harmonica days on this one."
Demola OG of NotJustOk said the song "may possibly cut cross the older and younger generation because it is D'banj and it appears that it has some element of a highlife." Oye Akideinde of 360 Nobs added, "Loving the cut. D Banj professes his love to a chick with a lovely 'backside."

Track listing 
 Digital single

Scape Goat (The Fix)

The remix of "Scapegoat", titled Scape Goat (The Fix)", features rap vocals from American rapper Kanye West. It was released on April 21, 2013. At the Radio 1 Hackney Weekend in London, D'banj first revealed plans to work with West during a backstage interview with Tim Westwood.

Critical reception
Upon its release, the song received mixed reviews from music critics. Jordan Sargent of Spin described the remix as "a delightfully sunny song that nudges up against soca." Carl Williott of Idolator described the remix as "refreshingly carefree and simple", but ended up saying that it "doesn’t amount to anything more than a momentary blip on the radar".

Track listing
 Digital single

References

2010 singles
2010 songs
D'banj songs
Kanye West songs
Song recordings produced by Don Jazzy
Songs written by Kanye West